The 2010–11 Northern Iowa Panthers men's basketball team represented the University of Northern Iowa during the 2010–11 NCAA Division I men's basketball season. The Panthers, led by fifth year head coach Ben Jacobson, played their home games at the McLeod Center and are members of the Missouri Valley Conference.

A Sweet Sixteen finisher in the 2010 NCAA tournament, UNI purchased the court on which the Panthers played in their season-ending tournament loss to the Michigan State Spartans.  The floor has been installed at the McLeod Center.

The Panthers finished the season 20–14, 10–8 in Missouri Valley play and lost in the quarterfinals of the 2011 Missouri Valley Conference men's basketball tournament. They were invited to the 2011 CollegeInsider.com Tournament where they defeated Rider in the first round and received a second round bye before falling to SMU in the quarterfinals.

Roster

Schedule
 
|-
!colspan=9 style=| Exhibition

|-
!colspan=9 style=| Regular season

|-
!colspan=9 style=| Missouri Valley tournament

|-
!colspan=9 style=| CollegeInsider.com tournament

References

Northern Iowa
Northern Iowa
Northern Iowa Panthers men's basketball seasons
Northern Iowa Panthers men's basketball
Northern Iowa Panthers men's basketball